Mitcham Library is a public library in Mitcham, England, being one of the libraries of the London Borough of Merton.  It was built in 1933 on land donated by a local builder, Mr Joseph Owen. In April 1932 he donated £4,025 towards its construction.

Multi-coloured brick with stone facings was used throughout. Over the main entrance are the words, "Mitcham Public Library", neatly carved in the stonework, with stone cornice. Three steps lead to the approach, and a pillar is placed on either side of the entrance. The doors of the library were of Austrian oak.

The initial stock of the library consisted of: lending department, 10,000 volumes costing £2,250; reference department, 1,500 volumes costing £750; junior department, 1,000 volumes costing £200.

References
Local newspaper, the Mitcham News and Mercury, 21 April 1933.

External links
 Official website

Library buildings completed in 1933
Public libraries in London
Libraries in the London Borough of Merton